Arturo Ferrario (28 June 1891 – 31 December 1966) was an Italian racing cyclist. He won stages 9 and 11 of the 1924 Giro d'Italia.

References

External links
 

1891 births
1966 deaths
Italian male cyclists
Italian Giro d'Italia stage winners
Cyclists from Milan